Corylopsis sinensis, the Chinese winter hazel (simplified Chinese: 蜡瓣花; traditional Chinese: 蠟瓣花; pinyin: là bàn huā), is a species of flowering plant in the witch-hazel family Hamamelidaceae, native to western China. With ovate leaves, it produces delicately fragrant, drooping racemes of pale yellow flowers with orange anthers in spring. 

The Latin specific epithet sinensis means "Chinese" or "of China". 

There are four varieties and one form recorded:- 
Corylopsis sinensis var. calvescens
Corylopsis sinensis var. glandulifera
Corylopsis sinensis var. parvifolia
Corylopsis sinensis var. sinensis	 	 	 
Corylopsis sinensis fo. veitchiana

This plant is cultivated as an ornamental. Both C. sinensis var. calvescens f. veitchiana and C. sinensis var. sinensis are recipients of the Royal Horticultural Society's Award of Garden Merit.

References

Hamamelidaceae
Flora of China